The Académie de Saint-Luc was the guild of painters and sculptors set up in Paris in 1391, and dissolved in 1776.

It was set up by the Provost of Paris in 1391, along the lines of the Guilds of Saint Luke in other parts of Europe.

The Académie de Saint-Luc was successful, as it attracted the artists who did not have access to the Académie Royale de Peinture et de Sculpture. This was particularly the case for women artists. In the 18th-century, there were 130 female members of the Académie de Saint-Luc, many more than at the Academie Royale de Peinture et de Sculpture, which in 1783 limited its female members to four.

In the 1770s, the success of the Académie de Saint-Luc provoked the enmity of the Academie Royale de Peinture et de Sculpture, which complained to the King and successfully petitioned for the closure of their rival. In February 1776 therefore, the Académie de Saint-Luc was closed on the order of Louis XVI of France. Some of its members later became accepted by the Academie Royale de Peinture et de Sculpture.

Members 
Jean Bassange
Henri Bonnart (Academy Rector)
Laurent Cars
Jean Siméon Chardin
Joseph Ducreux
Charles Eisen
Nicolas Fouché
Francois Guérin
Alexander Kucharsky
Jean-Baptiste Lallemand
François Perrier
Jean-Michel Picart
Nicolas-Jean-Baptiste Raguenet
Gabriel de Saint-Aubin
Pierre Scheemackers (Professor, from January 1764)
Sébastien Slodtz
Claude Joseph Vernet
Guillaume Voiriot
Élisabeth Vigée Le Brun

References

External links
Livrets des expositions de l'Académie de Saint-Luc à Paris: pendant les années 1751, 1752, 1753, 1756, 1762, 1764 et 1774 (in French)
"État de L'Académie de Saint-Luc au Moment de sa Suppression, en 1776" (in French)

Arts and culture in the Ancien Régime
French art
1391 establishments in Europe
1390s establishments in France
1777 disestablishments
Defunct organizations based in France